Mary Camille "Kamie" Ethridge (born April 21, 1964) is a former American basketball player and current basketball coach. She was an All-American point guard at the University of Texas at Austin and won a gold medal at the 1988 Summer Olympics. She is considered one of the best women's basketball players in history and was inducted into the Women's Basketball Hall of Fame in 2002. Ethridge is currently the head coach at Washington State University.

High school
Born in Hereford, Texas, Ethridge played guard for Monterey High School, in Lubbock, Texas. She led her team to a state championship (5A) in 1981.

College
Ethridge attended the University of Texas, where she played for Hall of Fame coach Jody Conradt. The Longhorns were one of the more powerful teams in the country at the time Ethridge joined the team, and she would help strengthen that position. Ethridge arrived at Texas in 1982. In her first two years, the team earned a two seed at the 1983 and the 1984 NCAA basketball tournament. In 1984, the team was strong enough to earn the number one ranking in the regular season final AP poll. The team suffered knee injuries to five key players in 1984, including injuries to center Annette Smith so severe she was in rehabilitation for well over a year. In 1985, the team would also end the season ranked number one in the poll. That year, the team went 28–3 in the regular season, and looked forward to a Final Four held at their own arena, the Erwin Center. The Longhorns were stunned by a buzzer beating shot by Western Kentucky, and lost 92–90 in the Mideast Regional semifinals.

Despite earning lofty rankings, the team entered the 1985–86 season without having won a National Championship. Ethridge was one of six seniors, including Fran Harris, who were in their last year of college ball with one last chance for a championship. Ethridge was considered very competitive she once competed in a triathlon, riding the 9-mile bicycle leg with a flat tire for the last three miles. The team was again ranked very high, prompting Sports Illustrated to refer to their arena as "the best little scorehouse in Texas".

That year, the team entered the tournament undefeated, and won all their tournament games, finishing the season as the first undefeated NCAA Division I women's basketball team (34–0), and national champions. Ethridge was the 1986 winner of the Honda Sports Award for basketball and the overall Honda-Broderick Cup winner for all sports. She was also the winner of the Wade Trophy, reflecting leadership and character in addition to athletic ability. Etheridge was the 1986 recipient of the Frances Pomeroy Naismith award, which is presented by the WBCA annually to "the nation's most outstanding NCAA Division I female basketball player who stands 5'8" tall or under". While at Texas, she had 776 assists, setting a school record.

On September 7, 2019, Kamie Ethridge's number 33 was officially retired at halftime of a Texas–LSU football game and she became the first female Longhorn athlete to receive this honor.

Texas statistics
Source

USA Basketball
Ethridge played for the USA World University Games team in Kobe, Japan in 1985. The team brought home a silver medal, after falling to the USSR. The team trailed by 18 points at one time, mounted a comeback attempt but fell short, losing 87–81. The following year, Ethridge played for the USA team at the World Championships, in Moscow. This time, the USA team would meet the USSR in the title game and emerge victorious, winning the gold medal with a score of 108–88.

Ethridge was a member of the gold medal-winning USA team competing in the Pan American games held in Indianapolis, Indiana during August 1987, although she saw limited action due to a knee injury sustained in the first game. Ethridge finished her USA basketball playing career with a gold medal win in the 1988 Olympics held in Seoul, Korea.

Coaching
Ethridge was a graduate assistant at Texas in 1987–88 after completing her bachelor's degree, then played professionally in Italy for the team OECE in 1988–89. Ethridge became a graduate assistant at Northern Illinois in 1989 and was promoted to assistant coach in 1990. She then moved on to Vanderbilt and was part of the coaching staff under Jim Foster to help the team to a 1993 Final Four appearance. She then moved on to Kansas State, first as an assistant, then as associate head coach, where she helped the team become competitive.

Ethridge landed her first head coaching job in 2014 at Northern Colorado, and enjoyed immediate success, leading the Bears to a school-record 22 wins in her first season. She went on to lead the team to two additional 20-win seasons, capped off by a 2017–18 season that saw a school record of 26 wins, Big Sky Conference regular-season and tournament titles and the program's first-ever appearance in the NCAA tournament as a Division I member. At the end of the regular season, Ethridge was named the Big Sky coach of the year. After the tournament appearance, she was hired away by Washington State to replace the fired June Daugherty.

Awards and honors

 1986—Winner of the Honda Sports Award for basketball
 1986—The Honda-Broderick Cup winner for all sports.
 1986—The Wade Trophy
 2000—University of Texas Women's Athletic Hall of Honor
 2002—Women's Basketball Hall of Fame
 2022—Pac-12 Coach of the Year
 2023—National Coach of the Year by The Athletic

Head coaching record

Notes

References

External links
Northern Colorado athletic site bio
Women's Basketball Hall of Fame profile

1964 births
Living people
All-American college women's basketball players
American expatriate basketball people in Italy
American women's basketball coaches
American women's basketball players
Basketball coaches from Texas
Basketball players at the 1987 Pan American Games
Basketball players at the 1988 Summer Olympics
Basketball players from Texas
Kansas State Wildcats women's basketball coaches
Medalists at the 1988 Summer Olympics
Northern Illinois Huskies women's basketball coaches
Northern Illinois University alumni
Olympic gold medalists for the United States in basketball
Pan American Games gold medalists for the United States
Pan American Games medalists in basketball
People from Hereford, Texas
Point guards
Sportspeople from Lubbock, Texas
Texas Longhorns women's basketball players
Universiade gold medalists for the United States
Universiade medalists in basketball
Vanderbilt Commodores women's basketball coaches
Washington State Cougars women's basketball coaches
Medalists at the 1987 Pan American Games
United States women's national basketball team players
Northern Colorado Bears women's basketball coaches